Leonardo Benedito da Silva (born 22 October 1992), commonly known as Naldinho or Leonardo, is a Brazilian footballer who currently plays as a striker for Nagoya Grampus.

Club career
Naldinho would move to China on 26 July 2019 to join second tier football club Xinjiang Tianshan Leopard. He would make his debut in a league game on 4 August 2019 against Liaoning F.C. where he also scored his first goal for the club in a 1-1 draw. The following season he would join another second tier club in Chengdu Rongcheng where after two seasons with the club he would establish himself as a regular within the team and aid them to promotion at the end of the 2021 league campaign.

Career statistics

Notes

References

External links

1992 births
Living people
Brazilian footballers
Association football forwards
Campeonato Brasileiro Série B players
Campeonato Brasileiro Série D players
China League One players
União Agrícola Barbarense Futebol Clube players
Sociedade Esportiva Matonense players
Boa Esporte Clube players
São Bernardo Futebol Clube players
Guarani de Palhoça players
São Carlos Futebol Clube players
Olímpia Futebol Clube players
Nacional Atlético Clube (SP) players
Al-Shabab SC (Kuwait) players
Xinjiang Tianshan Leopard F.C. players
Chengdu Rongcheng F.C. players
Nagoya Grampus players
Brazilian expatriate footballers
Brazilian expatriate sportspeople in Kuwait
Expatriate footballers in Kuwait
Brazilian expatriate sportspeople in China
Expatriate footballers in China
Expatriate footballers in Japan